General Sir John Kotelawala Defence University (KDU) (Sinhala: ජෙනරාල් ශ්‍රිමත් ජෝන් කොතලාවල ආරක්ෂක විශ්ව විද්‍යාලය General Sir John Kotelawala Arakshaka Vishva Vidyalaya) located at Kandawala, Ratmalana, Colombo, is a university which is administered by the Ministry of Defence.

The General Sir John Kotelawala Defence Academy was established in 1980 by the Sir John Kotelawala Defence Academy Act, No. 68 of 1981 as the joint defence service training institute of the Sri Lankan Armed Forces, where cadets of the three services, Sri Lanka Army, Sri Lanka Navy and Sri Lanka Air Force under go academic training together before they go on to respective service academy for further pre-commission training. It was named after General Sir John Kotelawala, third Prime Minister of Ceylon who donated his home for the academy. It was made a university by an amendment bill passed in Parliament on 11 October 2007 which lead to both military and civil students to be admitted.

History 
The General Sir John Kotelawala Defence Academy (the Defence University of Sri Lanka) was inaugurated on 11 October 1980 on a  estate donated by the late General Sir John Kotelawala, CH, KBE, LLD, a former Prime Minister of Ceylon. The KDU functions under the motto For The Motherland Forever, a dictum followed by General Sir John Kotelawala himself.

The KDA was instituted with the objective of educating males and females to be commissioned officers in the armed forces of Sri Lanka. It has been legally established under the Sir John Kotelawala Defence Academy Act No. 68 of 1981 and is governed by a Board of Management consisting of the Secretary of the Defence as the chairman, Commanders of the tri-services, representatives of the University Grant Commission and the General Treasury, and the Commandant of the academy as members.

From 1980 to 1986, a temporary arrangement was made for Service Officer Cadets follow courses in engineering and physical science at the University of Colombo and University of Moratuwa, and they were awarded the degree by the same universities. Later, KDA was elevated to university status subsequent to proposal made to the then government headed by the President J.R. Jayewardene, thus enabling KDA to offer degrees in Defence Studies. Today, the KDU is a member of the Association of Commonwealth Universities, United Kingdom.

An amendment bill was passed in Parliament on 18 March 2007 granting the status of a national university to the KDA. On 11 October 2007 KDA was renamed as the General Sir John Kotelawala Defence University.

KDU opened its southern campus at Sooriyawewa, Sri Lanka on 5 May 2015.

In October 2015 the KDU began to enrol paying civilian students as well as cadets from foreign militaries starting with a batch of technical officers from Oman Navy.

The opening of the University Hospital of General Sir John Kotelawala Defense University was held on 21 May 2017. KDU become first university in Sri Lanka, running its own University Hospital with modern facilities. The university hospital provide medical services to general public and service personnel free of charge.

In 2018, parliament of Sri Lanka passed the General Sir John Kotelawala Defence University (Special Provisions) Act to abolish medical faculty of South Asian Institute of Technology and Medicine and to transfer the students to General Sir John Kotelawala Defence University. General Sir John Kotelawala Defence University member of the  Association of Commonwealth Universities.

In June 2021, the State Minister of Internal Security, Home Affairs and Disaster Management presented the Sir John Kotelawala National Defence University Bill (Special Provisions), proposing legislative changes to the  governing structure  of the KDU. Controversially, the proposed Bill placed KDU management under the Defence Ministry, with a senior officer of the armed services serving as the president or vice-chancellor, rather than under the Ministry of Higher Education, as is the norm. This bill has been challenged by several groups including scholars and university students that have claimed the move could lead to privatization and militarization of the higher education in Sri Lanka.  It has been claimed that the bill would allow the KDU to continue function independent of the University Grants Commission and it will excludes the KDU from the purview of the UGC per its funding Sir John Kotelawala Defence Academy Act, No. 68 of 1981. These groups further claim that  any university that intends to offer civil education should not function without UGC control and quality assurance. For example, Article 15 2 (1) of the Bill explicitly specifies that the KDU is formed outside of the jurisdiction of the UGC Act No. 16 of 1978. As a result, unlike other state universities and higher education institutes in Sri Lanka that are governed by the UGC, KDU has the authority to regulate itself. In actuality, the KDU statute legalizes a full parallel military administration structure for civil higher education purposes with autonomy.

Academic wing 
The KDU is the only university in Sri Lanka offering Bachelor of Science in Degrees in Marine Engineering and Aeronautical Engineering.

The degree courses at the KDU run for two to five years. The officer cadets follow a course of study from the fields of medicine, law, engineering, management and technical sciences, commerce or arts. At the end of the second year, the officer cadets (other than the Engineering cadets who stay to complete their third-year studies) are sent to their military academies (Sri Lanka Military Academy, Diyatalawa; Naval and Maritime Academy, Trincomalee; Air Force Academy, SLAF China Bay).

Since 2012 the university was opened for non-military students under a payment scheme. These students are allowed to enjoy the academic and other facilities that were available for cadets before.

Academic work is conducted under the direction of the Board of Studies and Board of Management by the Director of Academic Studies. There are eight academic departments. Each department consist of a Head of the department, internal/visiting staff, and the library.

Faculties 
Defence Studies and Strategic Studies
Engineering
Bachelor of Science (Hons) in Aeronautical Engineering
Bachelor of Science (Hons) in Aircraft Maintenance Engineering
Bachelor of Science (Hons) in Biomedical Engineering
Bachelor of Science (Hons) in Civil Engineering
Bachelor of Science (Hons) in Electrical & Electronic Engineering
Bachelor of Science (Hons) in Electronics & Telecommunication Engineering
Bachelor of Science (Hons) in Marine Engineering
Bachelor of Science (Hons) in Mechanical Engineering
Bachelor of Science (Hons) in Mechatronic Engineering
Graduate Studies
PhD/MPhil
Master of Science (Defence Studies) in Management
Master of Science in Information Technology
Master of Business Administration in Logistics Management 
Master of Business Administration in E-governance 
Law
Bachelor of Laws
Management, Social Sciences and Humanities
Bachelor of Science in Logistics Management
Bachelor of Science in Management and Technical Sciences
Bachelor of Science in Social Sciences
Medicine
Bachelor of Medicine, Bachelor of Surgery
Allied Health Sciences
Bachelor of Science (Hons) in Physiotherapy
Bachelor of Science (Hons) in Nursing
Bachelor of Science (Hons) in Radiography
Bachelor of Science (Hons) in Radiotherapy
Bachelor of Science (Hons) in Medical Laboratory Sciences
Bachelor of Pharmacy
Computing
Bachelor of Science (Hons) in Computer Engineering
Bachelor of Science (Hons) in Computer Science
Bachelor of Science (Hons) in Software Engineering
Bachelor of Science (Hons) in Information Technology
Bachelor of Science (Hons) in Information Systems
Bachelor of Science (Hons) in Data Science and Business Analytics.
Built Environment and Spatial Sciences
Bachelor of Architecture
Bachelor of Science (Hons) in Built Environment
Bachelor of Science in Built Environment
Bachelor of Science (Hons) in Quantity Surveying
Bachelor of Science in Spatial Science
Bachelor of Science (Hons) in Spatial Science

Accredited institutions
Following institutions have been accredited to the KDU to conduct academic programs;

 National Defence College, Sri Lanka - Master of Science, for the successful participants of the National Defence and Strategic Study Course (ndc). 
 Defence Services Command and Staff College - Master of Science in Defence and Strategic Studies, for the successful participants of the Defence Services Command and Staff Course (psc).
 Army School of Logistics - Master of Business Administration in Logistics Management, for the successful participants of the Logistics Staff Course (LSC).
 Naval and Maritime Academy - Master of Business Administration in Logistics Management, for the successful participants of the Long Logistics Management Course (LLMC).
 Naval and Maritime Academy - Post Graduate Diploma in Defence Management, for the successful participants of the Junior Naval Staff Course.
 Sri Lanka Air Force Junior Command & Staff College - Post Graduate Diploma in Defence Management, for the successful participants of the Junior Command and Staff Course

Commandants/ Vice Chancellors

KDA was renamed as KDU in year 2007 and until such time chief executive officer was the Commandant. However, in 2007 after renaming as Kotelawala Defence University, Vice Chancellor is the Chief Executive of the university.

List of Commandants and Vice Chancellors are as follows:

Notable alumni 
 Yohani de Silva - singer

See also 
Education in Sri Lanka
Military of Sri Lanka
South Asian Institute of Technology and Medicine
Sri Lankan universities

References

External links

Official website of the Ministry of Defence, Sri Lanka
Official Army website
Memorials to a brave, old world by Rashomi Silva
Life at Sri Lanka’s top Defence University, nationalsecurity.lk

 
1980 establishments in Sri Lanka
Educational institutions established in 1980
Military academies of Sri Lanka
Statutory boards of Sri Lanka
Universities and colleges in Colombo District
Universities in Sri Lanka